Proteocephalinae is a subfamily of tapeworms in the Proteocephalidae family, which includes the genus Ophiotaenia.

Cestoda
Protostome subfamilies